Vishnu Circle is a 2019 Indian Kannada-language romantic drama film directed by Lakshmi Dinesh and produced by RB. The movie cast includes Gururaj, Samhita Vinya, Janvi Jyothi and Divya Gowda are in the lead roles.

Cast
Gururaj as Vishnu
Samhita Vinya as Aakruthi
Janvi Jyothi as Samskurthi
Divya Gowda
Aruna Balraj as Pramila
Hanumanthe Gowda as Rajanna
Dattanna

Reception 
The film received negative reviews from main Indian outlets.

References

External links 
 

2019 films
2019 romantic drama films
Indian romantic drama films
2010s Kannada-language films
2019 directorial debut films